Bartolomeo Maraschi (died 1487) was a Roman Catholic prelate who served as Bishop of Città di Castello (1474–1487).

Biography
On 15 July 1474, Bartolomeo Maraschi  was appointed by Pope Sixtus IV as Bishop of Città di Castello. As a papal envoy he traveled to Buda for peace negotiations with the emperor. He served as Bishop of Città di Castello until his death in 1487. From 1473 to his death he was also master of the papal chapel.

References

External links and additional sources
 (for Chronology of Bishops) 
 (for Chronology of Bishops) 

15th-century Italian Roman Catholic bishops
1487 deaths
Bishops appointed by Pope Sixtus IV